"Boot Scootin' Boogie" is a song first recorded by the band Asleep at the Wheel for their 1990 album, Keepin' Me Up Nights. American country music duo Brooks & Dunn recorded a cover version, which was included on their 1991 debut album, Brand New Man. It originally served as the B-side to their second single, "My Next Broken Heart". It became the duo's fourth single release and fourth consecutive number-one single on the U.S. Billboard Hot Country Singles chart.

In 2019, Brooks & Dunn re-recorded "Boot Scootin' Boogie" with American country music group Midland for their album Reboot.

Content
The song is a tribute to the line dancing in a Texas-style honky-tonk.

Dance culture
The song's success is credited with having sparked a renewed interest in line dancing throughout the United States. The song was Brooks & Dunn's first crossover hit, reaching number 50 on the U.S. Billboard Hot 100. A dance mix of "Boot Scootin' Boogie" can be found on Brooks & Dunn's 1993 album, Hard Workin' Man.

Cover versions
Country music singer George Strait covered the song from The Last Rodeo Tour

Music video
The music video was directed by Michael Merriman. The video was filmed at the Tulsa City Limits nightclub in Tulsa, Oklahoma.

Chart positions
"Boot Scootin' Boogie" debuted at number 73 on the U.S. Billboard Hot Country Singles chart for the week of May 23, 1992.

Year-end charts

References

1990 songs
1992 singles
Asleep at the Wheel songs
Brooks & Dunn songs
Midland (band) songs
Songs written by Ronnie Dunn
Song recordings produced by Scott Hendricks
Song recordings produced by Don Cook
Arista Nashville singles
Songs about dancing